Amorbimorpha is a genus of moths belonging to the subfamily Tortricinae of the family Tortricidae.

Species
Amorbimorpha mackayiana Kruse, 2012
Amorbimorpha powelliana Kruse, 2012
Amorbimorpha schausiana (Walsingham, 1913)
Amorbimorpha spadicea (Walsingham, 1913)

See also
 List of Tortricidae genera

References

  2012: Description of Amorbimorpha Kruse, new genus, from Mexico and the southern United States (Lepidoptera: Tortricidae: Sparganothini). Zootaxa, 3177: 33–42. Preview

Sparganothini
Moth genera